The Legion of Death was a regimental-size Slovenian anti-Communist militia of the Second World War. It consisted of three battalions and was formed in August 1942 when the Blue Guard Styrian battalion was incorporated into the Anti-Communist Volunteer Militia, the anti-Communist militia of the Fascist Italians who occupied Slovenia at the time. It mainly fought against the Communist Yugoslav Partisans.
The unit reached a strength of 1,731 members in October 1942, but plans for further expansion were never realized. The unit was mainly led by former Yugoslav Royal Army officers. When the Italians capitulated in 1943, the unit was disbanded and its members absorbed into the Slovene Home Guard units.

References

Military units and formations established in 1942
Military units and formations disestablished in 1943
Military units and formations of Yugoslavia in World War II
Collaborators with Nazi Germany
Collaborators with Fascist Italy
Slovenia in World War II
Yugoslavia in World War II